Michael Crane (30 September 1952 – 2 July 2022) was an English professional rugby league footballer who played in the 1970s and 1980s.

Biography
Crane made his début for Hull F.C. in 1970. Crane played , and scored 2-tries in Hull FC's 13–19 defeat by Widnes in the 1975–76 Player's No.6 Trophy Final during the 1975–76 season at Headingley Rugby Stadium, Leeds on Saturday 24 January 1976, and played left-, i.e. number 11, in the 12–4 victory over Hull Kingston Rovers in the 1981–82 John Player Trophy Final during the 1981–82 season at Headingley Rugby Stadium, Leeds on Saturday 23 January 1982.

Crane was transferred from Hull F.C. to Leeds in December 1977. Crane played  in Leeds' 14–12 victory over St. Helens in the 1977–78 Challenge Cup Final during the 1977–78 season at Wembley Stadium, London on Saturday 13 May 1978. In November 1979 he moved to Hull Kingston Rovers.

Crane played  in Hull Kingston Rovers' 7–8 defeat by Leeds in the 1980–81 Yorkshire County Cup Final during the 1980–81 season at Fartown Ground, Huddersfield on Saturday 8 November 1980, played left-, i.e. number 11 (Trevor Skerrett played left- in the replay), in Hull FC's 14–14 draw with Widnes in the 1981–82 Challenge Cup Final during the 1981–82 season at Wembley Stadium, London on Saturday 1 May 1982, in front of a crowd of 92,147, played as an interchange/substitute, i.e. number 15, (replacing  Steve "Knocker" Norton) in the 18–9 victory over Widnes in the 1981–82 Challenge Cup Final replay during the 1981–82 season at Elland Road, Leeds on Wednesday 19 May 1982, in front of a crowd of 41,171, played , (replaced by interchange/substitute Steve "Knocker" Norton) in the 18–7 victory over Bradford Northern in the 1982–83 Yorkshire County Cup Final during the 1982–83 season at Elland Road, Leeds on Saturday 2 October 1982, and played , scored a try, and a drop goal, and was man of the match winning the White Rose Trophy in the 13–2 victory over Castleford in the 1983–84 Yorkshire County Cup Final during the 1983–84 season at Elland Road, Leeds on Saturday 15 October 1983.

Crane won a cap for Great Britain while at Hull in the 8–32 defeat by Australia at Headingley Rugby Stadium, Leeds on Sunday 28 November 1982.

References

1952 births
2022 deaths
English rugby league players
Great Britain national rugby league team players
Hull F.C. players
Hull Kingston Rovers players
Leeds Rhinos players
Rugby league centres
Rugby league locks
Rugby league players from Kingston upon Hull
Rugby league second-rows